Hangzhou Qiandaohu Beer Co., Ltd. (Chinese: 杭州千岛湖啤酒有限公司) is a brewery located in the town of Qiandaohu, in Chun'an County, Hangzhou, Zhejiang, China. It produces several brands of beer, including Cheerday.

The company is named for Qiandao Lake, next to which its headquarters and brewery are located. In December 2006, the Kirin Brewery Company of Japan bought a 25% stake in the Hangzhou Qiandaohu Beer Co., Ltd. for US$38 million.

See also
Beer and breweries in China

References

External links
Hangzhou Qiandaohu Beer Co., Ltd. official site (Chinese)
Cheerday Beer official site (Chinese)
Cheerday beers (Chinese)
Hangzhou Qiandaohu Beer Co., Ltd. company profile
Article about Hangzhou Qiandaohu Beer Co., Ltd.
Article about Cheerday Beer

Beer in China
Companies with year of establishment missing
Kirin Group
Chun'an County
Companies based in Hangzhou
Buildings and structures in Hangzhou